Cladolasma parvulum, is a species of harvestman belonging to the family Nemastomatidae. It is found in Japan.

References

Animals described in 1963
Harvestmen